The 1973 Limerick Senior Hurling Championship was the 79th staging of the Limerick Senior Hurling Championship since its establishment by the Limerick County Board.

South Liberties were the defending champions.

On 25 November 1973, Kilmallock won the championship after a 2-12 to 2-04 defeat of Killeedy in the final. It was their third championship title overall and their first championship title since 1967.

Results

Final

Championship statistics

Miscellaneous

 Cork County Board Secretary Frank Murphy was selected as the referee for the final.

References

Limerick Senior Hurling Championship
Limerick Senior Hurling Championship